Raúl Sendic Antonaccio (16 March 1926 – 28 April 1989) was a Uruguayan Marxist lawyer, trade unionist and founder of the Tupamaros National Liberation Movement (MLN-T).

Early life and education
Born in a rural area, near the village of Juan Jose Castro, in the Flores Department, Sendic worked with his father as a peasant on a crab apple farm until he finished high school and left his home to study in Montevideo. In 1952, he obtained the title of Procurator before completing his law degree as Lawyer (he did five and a half of the six years required for the law degree).

Union leadership
During his time in Montevideo, he joined the socialist youth movement of the Socialist Party of Uruguay, becoming a prominent member. His social activity intensified during the 1950s, as he became trade union attorney of rural workers and, later, union founder. UTAA (sugar cane workers), SUDA (sugar beet workers) and the project for an all-inclusive association of rural workers, SUDOR, were born as a result of his actions. Sendic both saw and experienced the abuse by agricultural employers in areas where there seemed to be no awareness of democracy. In the late 1950s Sendic started a campaign to create social awareness of the cane workers' situation in Montevideo. Four hundred workers marched to Montevideo with the motto "For the land and with Sendic". The marchers were repeatedly repressed.

Founding of Tupamaros
Hence, Sendic began to think that the only option for the country was terrorist violence that should complement the workers' requests. In 1963, the Tupamaros robbed an arms shop in Colonia to found a guerrilla movement. However, the MLN-T began to be recognised because of its activities only in 1967, when government repression, during the presidency of Jorge Pacheco Areco, caused the mobilization and response of a variety of groups, principally the Tupamaros.

MLN-T began by staging the robbing of banks, gun clubs and other businesses in the early 1960s, then distributing stolen food and money among the poor in Montevideo. By the late 1960s, it was engaged in political kidnappings, armed propaganda and assassinations. The group kidnapped bank manager Pereyra Rebervel and the United Kingdom ambassador to Uruguay, Geoffrey Jackson, as well as kidnapping and murdering Dan Mitrione, an FBI agent alleged to have taught techniques of torture to police forces in various Latin American countries.

The peak of the Tupamaros was in 1970 and 1971. During this period they made liberal use of their "People's Prison" where they held those that they kidnapped. In 1971 over 100 imprisoned Tupamaros escaped the Punta Carretas prison. Nonetheless, the movement was hampered by a series of events including serious strategic gaffes and the betrayal of high-ranking Tupamaro Héctor Amodio Pérez, police officers who were granted liberal repressive powers to deal with Tupamaros. Sendic was arrested in Uruguay on 7 August 1970, and remained in prison until his escape 6 September 1971. The mass escape of the year 71 caused the civilian authority to call the Uruguayan military to lead the operations (so far being undertaken by the police). Sendic remained in Uruguay as a fugitive until his eventual capture one year later. The Tupamaros lead an increase on their aggressive activities during the massacres of April the 14th and May the 18th. 

This caused the Uruguayan military to unleashed a series of operations and mass arrests, dispersing those guerrillas who were not killed or arrested. The tactics were incredibly effective, and by the end of 1972, the MLN-T had been severely weakened. Its principal leaders were imprisoned under for the next 12 years. Despite the diminished threat, the civilian government of Juan María Bordaberry ceded governmental authority to the military in 1973 in a bloodless coup d'état that led to further repression against the population and the suppression of all political parties.

Second imprisonment
Raúl Sendic and eight of the MLN-T leaders were confined to different improvised prisons in poor conditions for 12 years. They suffered continuous physical and psychological torture. After the military dictatorship fell in 1985, Sendic was released from prison.  The Tupamaros returned to public life as part of a political party, the Movement of Popular Participation. Today, the party comprises the largest single group within the ruling left-wing Frente Amplio coalition.

United Nations complaint
In November 1979, Sendic's wife, Violeta Setelich, submitted a complaint to the United Nations Human Rights Committee on his behalf, alleging breaches of the International Covenant on Civil and Political Rights (ICCPR), a treaty to which Uruguay is a party.  In October 1981, the Committee found that Uruguay violated articles 7, 9, 10 and 14 of the ICCPR in respect of Sendic during his trial and imprisonment.

Death and legacy
Sendic died in Paris in 1989, aged 63, of amyotrophic lateral sclerosis.  His funeral was held in Montevideo, where he was buried. His son, Raúl Fernando Sendic Rodríguez, is a former Vice President of Uruguay, having also served as Industry Minister.

See also
 List of political families#Uruguay

References

External links
 La tierra: un tema tabú que vuelve, Raúl Sendic, 1987

1926 births
1989 deaths
Uruguayan people of Croatian descent
Uruguayan people of Italian descent
People from Flores Department
Neurological disease deaths in France
Deaths from motor neuron disease
United Nations Human Rights Committee case law
Uruguayan communists
Terrorism in Uruguay
Movement of Popular Participation politicians
Socialist Party of Uruguay politicians
Uruguayan guerrillas
Burials at Cementerio de La Teja, Montevideo

el:Τουπαμάρος